Quintard may refer to:

People with the surname
 Charles Todd Quintard (1824-1898), American physician and clergyman

Places
 Quintard Avenue, a street in Anniston, Alabama, United States
 Quintard Mall, a mall in Oxford, Alabama, United States